Maria Karoline Elisabeth Grollmuß (Sorbian: Marja Grólmusec) (April 24, 1896 in Leipzig – August 6, 1944 in Ravensbrück) was a Catholic Sorbian publicist and a socialist resistance member against the Nazi government.

Biography 
Maria Grollmuß was born on April 24, 1896 to principal and linguist Dr. Johannes Grollmuß (Sorbian: Jan Grólmus) in Leipzig. After having finished her formation at Gaudigsches Lehrerinnenseminar in Leipzig in 1917, she shortly worked as an elementary school teacher at Bürgerschule Leipzig-Reudnitz before studying linguistics and history in Berlin and  Leipzig. She graduated in 1928, earning a PhD for her thesis  ('Joesph Görres and Democracy'). While studying, she was a member of the Windhorstbund at first, and later, she also became a member of the Socialist Students Union.

Maria Grollmuß was especially interested in political journalism. Accordingly, she wrote various articles for Rhein-Mainische Volkszeitung, a newspaper close to the left wing of Zentrumspartei, and for the magazine of the Catholic youth movement "Quickborn" called Die Schildgenossen, initiated by Romano Guardini.

While she changed party various times, her political focus was always social and leftist politics. She started as a member of SPD in 1927 and left the party to join KPD in 1929. She was excluded from KPD due to her opposition to forming separate communist trade unions, so she joined the Kommunistischen Partei-Opposition, whose minority wing she belonged to together with Paul Frölich and Jacob Walcher. They left the party in 1932 to join Sozialistischen Arbeiterpartei Deutschlands (SAPD).

After the NSDAP took over in, she continued her political activity illegally. In close cooperation with the Arbeitskreis Revolutionärer Sozialisten, she supported political prisoners, transported illegal literature and helped endangered comrades to escape to Czechoslovakia. She operated from the village of Radibor in Upper Lusatia, her father's place of birth. She was in contact with resistance groups of the SPD, KPD, SAPD and the Austrian socialist Otto Bauer.

She was denounced to the German authorities and on November 7, 1934 she was arrested together with Hermann Reinmuth. At first, she was imprisoned in Dresden. She was sentenced to six years of prison by the Volksgerichtshof on November 23, 1935 (Reinmuth got seven years) and sent to Waldheim prison. During her imprisonment, she turned to Catholic spirituality. The Nazi government offered her freedom and cancer therapy if she agreed to spy for them in the Sorbian resistance movement once having served her term. She refused. Therefore, she was sent to Ravensbrück concentration camp. In Ravensbrück, she tried to support Polish and Czechoslovak prisoners using her language skills. She died on August 6, 1944 due to a tumor surgery conducted under undue circumstances. Her urn was buried on Radibor Cemetery.

Honors 

She was honored by the GDR for being a Sorbian antifascist and resistance fighter. Streets in Bautzen, Hoyerswerda, Leipzig and some Lusatian towns commemorate her. In Schleife and Radibor, schools are named after her. In Radibor, there is a statue of her, too.

Works

Further reading 

 Maria Kubasch: Maria Grollmuss. Für eine Zukunft echter Gemeinschaft (= Christ in der Welt, Heft 26). Union-Verlag, Berlin 1970.
 
 Gerd Schäfer: Dr. Maria Grollmuß (1896–1944) – Eine fast vergessene Grenzgängerin. In: JahrBuch für Forschungen zur Geschichte der Arbeiterbewegung, Jg. 2012, Heft III.

External links 

 
 Swen Steinberg: Grólmusec (Grollmuß), Marja (Maria Karoline Elisabeth). In: Institut für Sächsische Geschichte und Volkskunde (Hrsg.): Sächsische Biografie (in German).

References 

1944 deaths
1896 births
People from Leipzig
People who died in Ravensbrück concentration camp
German resistance members
Socialist Workers' Party of Germany politicians
Communist Party of Germany (Opposition) politicians
Communist Party of Germany members
Social Democratic Party of Germany politicians
Sorbian people